is a train station in Karatsu, Saga Prefecture, Japan. It is operated by JR Kyushu and is a transfer station for the Karatsu and Chikuhi lines.

Lines

Station layout 
The station consists of a side and an island platform serving three tracks at grade with two sidings branching off track 1. The station building is an old timber structure of traditional Japanese design with a double tiled roof. It is unstaffed and serves only to house a waiting room and an automatic ticket vending machine. Access to the island platform is by means of a level crossing with steps.

Adjacent stations

History
On 1 December 1898, the private Karatsu Kogyo Railway opened the station as the southern terminus of a track which it had built down the west bank of the Matsuura River from Miyoken (now ). On 23 February 1902, the company, now renamed the Karatsu Railway, merged with the Kyushu Railway. When the Kyushu Railway was nationalized on 1 July 1907, Japanese Government Railways (JGR) took over control of the station. On 12 October 1909, the line which served the station was designated the Karatsu Line.

The Kitakyushi Railway was nationalised on 1 October 1937 and JGR, now in control, designated the track from Higashi-Karatsu through Yamamoto to Imari as part of the Chikuhi Line. For many years thereafter, Yamamoto was the only transfer station between the Karatsu and Chikuhi Line. On 22 March 1983, a new route for the Chikuhi Line was opened, with Highashi-Karatsu relocated and a through-track built across the Matsuura River from there via  to Karatsu. The stretch of track from Higashi-Karatsu down the east bank of the Matsuura River was closed. Chikuhi Line trains now used the Karatsu Line track down the west bank from Karatsu to reach Yamamoto before rejoining the western section of Chikuhi Line to Imari.

With the privatization of Japanese National Railways (JNR), the successor of JGR, on 1 April 1987, control of the station passed to JR Kyushu.

Yamamoto was also the terminal for a number of branch lines which have since closed. A branch to Ōchitankō opened in 1905 for freight closed in 1978. Another freight line to Kanokuchi opened in 1909 and closed in 1912. A branch to Kishitake opened in 1912 and closed in 1971.

Passenger statistics
In fiscal 2015, there were a total of 114,541 boarding passengers, giving a daily average of 314 passengers.

Environs
Karatsu Technical High School
Saga Prefectural Hokubu School for the Handicapped
National Route 203

References

External links
Yamamoto Station (JR Kyushu)

Railway stations in Saga Prefecture
Karatsu Line
Chikuhi Line
Railway stations in Japan opened in 1898